Siah Gurab-e Pain (also Romanized as Sīāh Gūrāb-e Pā’īn; also known as Seyāh Qorāb, Sīāh Gūrāb, Sīāh Qorāb, and Siyah Gowdab) is a village in Layalestan Rural District, in the Central District of Lahijan County, Gilan Province, Iran. At the 2006 census, its population was 84, in 31 families.

References 

Populated places in Lahijan County